Gheorghe Cernei (born ) is a Moldovan-born Romanian male weightlifter, competing in the 85 kg category and representing Romania at international competitions. He competed at world championships, including at the 2015 World Weightlifting Championships.  He won the bronze medal at the 2016 European Weightlifting Championships. Previously he represented Moldova in youth international competitions. In late 2013 he was suspended by the International Weightlifting Federation (IWF) in view of an anti-doping rule violation.

Major results

References

1990 births
Living people
Moldovan male weightlifters
Romanian male weightlifters
Place of birth missing (living people)
Doping cases in weightlifting
Moldovan sportspeople in doping cases
Naturalised citizens of Romania 
Moldovan expatriate sportspeople in Romania